Joey Archer (born February 11, 1938 in New York City, New York) is an American retired boxer. He defeated Sugar Ray Robinson in Robinson's final fight in 1965 (by unanimous decision) and fought Hall of Fame boxers such as Emile Griffith and Dick Tiger.

Professional boxing career
“Irish” Joey Archer began his career in 1956 at 18 years of age. He was a master boxer with excellent speed but lacked any semblance of power in his punches. Fighting mostly in various New York and Texas venues, he was a winner in his first 30 fights, with only 7 victories coming inside the distance. His most notable win was against the highly ranked Don Fullmer by a decision. This win earned Archer a date against tough Puerto Rican contender Jose “Monon” Gonzalez, who gave Archer his first defeat in a split decision.

Two months later Archer avenged the loss by beating Gonzalez in a decisive decision. The victory propelled Archer on a streak of 15 consecutive wins against some of the Middleweight division's top fighters, including England's Mick Leahy, Denny Moyer, Argentina's Farid Salim, Canada's Blair Richardson, Holley Mims, Rubin “Hurricane” Carter, and his most impressive career win, against future Hall-of-Famer and three time World champion Dick Tiger.

The final win in the streak was against “Sugar” Ray Robinson in what would be the last fight of Robinson's illustrious, Hall-of-Fame career. Having reached the top of the Middleweight division, Archer suffered an unexpected split decision loss to the ranked Don Fullmer.

Nevertheless, Archer earned a title challenge against Middleweight champion Griffith based on his recent winning streak. The title fight against Virgin Islander Griffith in 1966 was a hard-fought, close contest, and after 15 rounds of fighting, Griffith won by a majority decision.

Archer's dream of winning the prized Middleweight title went unfulfilled, as the referee ruled the contest a draw, with the other two judges voting in favor of the champion. Six months later, Archer would again fight Griffith for the Middleweight title, and would once again taste defeat in a very narrow, controversial decision.

Retirement
“Irish” Joey Archer announced his retirement from boxing after the disappointment of these two bitter, close losses to Emile Griffith. He ended his career with a record of 45 victories (with 8 by KO) and only 4 defeats.

Although he never captured a world title, Archer's boxing skills earned him induction into the World Boxing Hall of Fame in 2005. He is on the eligibility list of the International Boxing Hall of Fame.

Professional boxing record

References

External links

 Brief Lives: Joey Archer

1938 births
Living people
American male boxers
Boxers from New York City
Middleweight boxers